Rondeletia dolphinensis is a species of plant in the family Rubiaceae. It is endemic to Jamaica.

References

Flora of Jamaica
dolphinensis
Endangered plants
Endemic flora of Jamaica
Taxonomy articles created by Polbot